Kucieje  is a village in the administrative district of Gmina Baranowo, within Ostrołęka County, Masovian Voivodeship, in east-central Poland.

The village has a population of 82.

References

Kucieje